The Moyle House and Indian Tower is a historic residence and watchtower in Alpine, Utah, United States, that is listed on the National Register of Historic Places.

Description
The house is located at 606 East 770 North, on the northeast side of the Moyle Historical Park.

The house was expanded in 1859-1860 from a c.1858 dugout house. The tower, built during 1860–1866, was built as a private fort for defense against Indians of the Black Hawk War of 1865–1868, and is the only such tower known to have been built for protection of a single household in Utah.  These stone structures were built by English-born mason and Mormon, John Rowe Moyle.  His son Joseph Moyle expanded the house in 1917, adding Bungalow/Craftsman elements.  A dugout/food cellar also was built during c.1858–60.  These three structures are included in the NRHP listing.

John Moyle also built a home for a second wife in a nearby property, not part of the NRHP listing.

See also Fort Deseret and Cove Fort, also NRHP-listed, also private forts.

The property was listed on the National Register of Historic Places December 23, 1992.

See also

 National Register of Historic Places listings in Utah County, Utah
 Cove Fort, another NRHP-listed private fort
 Fort Deseret, another NRHP-listed private fort

References

External links

American Craftsman architecture in Utah
Bungalow architecture in Utah
Fortified houses
Houses completed in 1860
Houses in Utah County, Utah
Houses on the National Register of Historic Places in Utah
Pre-statehood history of Utah
Towers completed in 1866
Forts on the National Register of Historic Places in Utah
1858 establishments in Utah Territory
National Register of Historic Places in Utah County, Utah
Alpine, Utah
Buildings and structures in Utah County, Utah